Chiara Costazza (born 6 May 1984) is an Italian former World Cup alpine ski racer, who specialized in slalom.

Born in Cavalese, Trentino, Costazza resides in Pozza di Fassa. She won one World Cup race, a slalom, in December 2007 at Lienz, Austria, and competed in four Winter Olympics and six World Championships.

World Cup results

Season standings

Race podiums
 1 win – (1 SL)
 2 podiums – (2 SL); 32 top tens

World Championship results

Olympic results

References

External links
 
Italian Winter Sports Federation – (FISI)  – alpine skiing – Chiara Costazza – 

1984 births
Living people
People from Cavalese
Italian female alpine skiers
Olympic alpine skiers of Italy
Alpine skiers at the 2006 Winter Olympics
Alpine skiers at the 2010 Winter Olympics
Alpine skiers at the 2014 Winter Olympics
Alpine skiers at the 2018 Winter Olympics
Alpine skiers of Fiamme Oro
Sportspeople from Trentino